Tibor Maracskó (born 8 September 1948) is a Hungarian former modern pentathlete who competed in the 1976 Summer Olympics and in the 1980 Summer Olympics. In 1976, he won a bronze in the team event and in 1980, he won a silver in same event.

References

1948 births
Living people
Hungarian male modern pentathletes
Olympic modern pentathletes of Hungary
Modern pentathletes at the 1976 Summer Olympics
Modern pentathletes at the 1980 Summer Olympics
Olympic silver medalists for Hungary
Olympic bronze medalists for Hungary
Olympic medalists in modern pentathlon
Sportspeople from Székesfehérvár
Medalists at the 1980 Summer Olympics
Medalists at the 1976 Summer Olympics
20th-century Hungarian people
21st-century Hungarian people